was a free-to-play fighting video game developed and published by Namco Bandai Games. It was released on the PlayStation 3 via the PlayStation Store in June 2013. It is the first game in the Tekken franchise to be made free-to-play and the first to be released exclusively in digital format. It is no longer available in Europe as of 2016.

The game ceased operations on March 20, 2017.

Gameplay
Tekken Revolution, by and large, is a modification of Tekken Tag Tournament 2, reusing assets like backgrounds and character models from that game (although it has a new soundtrack). It introduces various new mechanics, such as Special Arts and Critical Arts moves designed to help new players. Bound, the mechanic where characters can be staggered to allow more chance to inflict additional attacks has mostly been removed; the only way to activate it is by breaking or falling through environments. Movement has been revamped, particularly in the way characters walk backwards (prior to Revolution, back walking was a slow shuffle but is now a more nimble stride away from the adversary; the new backwards walk animation would carry over to Tekken 7). For the first time in the Tekken series, a stat-upgrade feature is implemented, in which players can spend Skill Points (4 are awarded every time you level up) to increase the player's character's: Power (attack strength); Endurance (health gauge) and; Vigor (chance of landing a critical hit or entering a Rage state, determined by the difference between you and your opponent's Vigor). While the stats are compulsorily applied in Arcade Mode and Ranked Matches, an option to disable them in Player Matches is available through an update.

Series staple modes, such as Arcade mode return, where players battle against AI opponents, as well as Online Mode, where players battle each other through online Ranked and Player matches. Practice mode (known as "Warm-up Mode" in-game), which was absent during launch, was eventually added in a major update released a month after launch. The game also introduces a new temporary mode, "Mokujin Rush", accessible only as part of event promotions, which allows players to battle Mokujin-type enemies (including his palette swaps Tetsujin and Kinjin) and obtain higher rewards than usual battles. A new gimmick, "Turbo Rush" is applied to the mode every so often, where the battles will be sped up, allowing for a more fast-paced combat.

Fighters
There are a total of 29 playable fighters in the game, twelve of whom are part of the launch cast with eight being available by default. Nearly all of them are returning characters, although the game also introduces two newcomers, the vampire Eliza, who is unlockable by collecting "Blood Seals" through battles, and Kinjin, who only appears as an unplayable boss character, alongside Heihachi Mishima, Jinpachi Mishima, Mokujin, Tetsujin, and Ogre (or a golden version of him). Characters beyond the initial twelve were added periodically in a span of eight months; the last character update was Jaycee, who was made playable beginning on February 13, 2014. It was first main spin-off game of Tekken to not feature Yoshimitsu, making Heihachi Mishima, Nina Williams and Paul Phoenix the only 3 characters to be playable in all main spin-off fighting game versions of Tekken.

Alisa Bosconovitch (unlockable)
Armor King (update and unlockable)
Asuka Kazama
Bob (update and unlockable)
Bryan Fury (unlockable)
Christie Monteiro (update and unlockable)
Devil Jin (update and unlockable)
Eliza (update and unlockable) (new)
Feng Wei (update and unlockable)
Heihachi Mishima (Unplayable Boss)
Hwoarang (update and unlockable)
Jack-6
Jaycee (update and unlockable)

Jin Kazama (update and unlockable)
Jinpachi Mishima (Unplayable Boss)
Jun Kazama (update and unlockable)
Kazuya Mishima / Devil Kazuya (In-battle transformation)
King
Kinjin (Update and unplayable Boss) (new)
Kuma (update and unlockable)
Kunimitsu (update and unlockable)
Lars Alexandersson
Lee Chaolan (update and unlockable)
Leo (unlockable)
Lili
Ling Xiaoyu (update and unlockable)

Marshall Law
Miguel Caballero Rojo (update and unlockable)
Mokujin (Update and unplayable Boss)
Nina Williams (update and unlockable)
Ogre (Unplayable Boss)
Paul Phoenix
Sergei Dragunov (update and unlockable)
Steve Fox (unlockable)
Tetsujin (Update and unplayable Boss)

Reception

Tekken Revolution received mixed reviews. Edge noted its attempt to bring the series close to its arcade roots, but criticized it as a watered-down version of Tekken Tag Tournament 2 and its "pay-to-win" nature. Gamesmaster also stated "There's plenty to play with here, but you'll have to pay to win online." OPM enjoyed the game, concluding "It’s just like being back in the arcades (with lots of Japanese kids kicking your arse)." Despite the mixed reception, Katsuhiro Harada confirmed that Tekken Revolution was downloaded over 2 million times.

See also
Dead or Alive 5 Ultimate: Core Fighters, another free-to-play fighting game released in September 2013.

References

External links

2013 video games
Fighting games
Free-to-play video games
PlayStation 3-only games
PlayStation Network games
PlayStation 3 games
Video games set in Brazil
Video games set in Canada
Video games set in Chile
Video games set in Colombia
Video games set in Germany
Video games set in Fiji
Video games set in Finland
Video games set in France
Video games set in Japan
Video games set in the Netherlands
Video games set in Norway
Video games set in Russia
Video games set in Spain
Video games set in the United Kingdom
Inactive multiplayer online games
Video games developed in Japan
Video games scored by Shinji Hosoe
Products and services discontinued in 2017
Revolution